Obetia is a genus of dioecious plants in the family Urticaceae, with stinging hairs. The genus contains the following species:
Obetia carruthersiana (Hiern) Rendle
Obetia ficifolia Gaudich.
Obetia madagascariensis (Juss. ex Poir.) Wedd.
Obetia radula (Baker) Baker ex B.D. Jacks. stinging-nettle tree
Obetia tenax Friis

References

External links

Urticaceae
Urticaceae genera
Dioecious plants